Spartacus Legends was a free-to-play video game based on the Starz television series Spartacus. Developed by Kung Fu Factory and published by Ubisoft, Spartacus Legends was released on PlayStation Network and Xbox Live in 2013. On December 22, 2015, Spartacus Legends was discontinued.

Reception

The PlayStation 3 version received "mixed" reviews, while the Xbox 360 version received "unfavorable" reviews, according to the review aggregation website Metacritic.

Nicholas Tan of GameRevolution praised the amount of content the PS3 version had on offer, but criticized the difficulty and lack of polish in said console version.

References

External links
Official website

2013 video games
Cultural depictions of Spartacus
Fighting games
Free-to-play video games
Kung Fu Factory games
Multiplayer and single-player video games
Online-only games
PlayStation 3 games
PlayStation Network games
Spartacus (TV series)
Ubisoft games
Video games developed in the United States
Xbox 360 games
Xbox 360 Live Arcade games